The Tennessee Club, also known as the Overall Goodbar Building, is a historic townhouse in Memphis, Tennessee, U.S.. Designed by architect Elah Terrell, it was built in 1888 for two doctors by the names of Overall and Peete. Colonel William F. Taylor, a veteran of the Confederate States Army who served under General Nathan Bedford Forrest during the American Civil War, also had an office in the building. By 1890, it became the home of the Tennessee Club, a social club founded in 1875. From 1907 to 1927, it was home to Overton and Overton, a real estate firm. It has been listed on the National Register of Historic Places since April 22, 1982.

References

Buildings and structures on the National Register of Historic Places in Tennessee
Romanesque Revival architecture in Tennessee
Buildings and structures completed in 1888
Buildings and structures in Memphis, Tennessee
1888 establishments in Tennessee